Kazimieras Būga (November 6, 1879 – December 2, 1924) was a Lithuanian linguist and philologist. He was a professor of linguistics, who mainly worked on the Lithuanian language.

He was born at Pažiegė, near Dusetos, then part of the Russian Empire.  Appointed as personal secretary to Lithuanian linguist Kazimieras Jaunius he showed great interest in the subject, and during the period 1905-12 studied at Saint Petersburg State University. After that, he continued his work on Indo-European language under the supervision of Jan Niecisław Baudouin de Courtenay. He later moved to Köningsberg to continue his studies under the direction of Adalbert Bezzenberger. In 1914 he received a master's degree in linguistics.

His research on Lithuanian personal names led him into the study of place-names. From these he was able to determine that the homeland of the Lithuanians and other Baltic peoples up to the 6th to 9th centuries CE had been just north of Ukraine in the area around the Pripyat River. In addition, he studied the chronological sequence of Slavic loanwords in the Baltic languages.

He also carried out a linguistic reconstruction of the names of the early princes of the Grand Duchy of Lithuania and refuted the theories of their Slavic origin. This became the main thrust for the concept of the Academic Dictionary of Lithuanian (Didysis Lietuvių Kalbos Žodynas) in Lithuanian.  He died in Königsberg, and was buried at Petrašiūnai Cemetery in Kaunas.

References 

 Antanas Klimas (The University of Rochester), Kazimieras Būga and the Academic Dictionary of Lithuanian, Lituanus, Volume 27, No.4 - Winter 1981
 Kazimieras Būga, from the Encyclopedia Lituanica I-VI, Boston, 1970-1978, published in the Lithuanian Word by the Seimas Commission on Traditions and Heritage of Lituanistics

External links 
 Academic Dictionary of Lithuanian language on internet
 Digitised card files for Būga's never-written etymological dictionary of Lithuanian

Balticists
1879 births
1924 deaths
People from Zarasai District Municipality
Linguists from Lithuania
Historical linguists
Lithuanian lexicographers
Linguists of Lithuanian
Academic staff of Perm State University
Burials at Petrašiūnai Cemetery